Plymouth Lifeboat Station is the base for Royal National Lifeboat Institution (RNLI) search and rescue operations at Plymouth in England. The first lifeboat was stationed in the city in the early 1800s. The station moved to its present site at Millbay Docks in 1992, a Grade II-listed three-storey tower. Since 2003 it has operated a  all weather boat (ALB) along with an  inshore lifeboat (ILB).

History
Plymouth was one of the towns that received one of the Lloyds  lifeboats in the first decade of the nineteenth century, but it never saw service. In 1825 a new lifeboat was provided by the new National Institution for the Preservation of Life from Shipwreck (renamed the Royal National Lifeboat Institution in 1854), but this too saw no use.

A new lifeboat station was established in Plymouth in 1862 with a lifeboat house on the West Wharf of the outer basin of Millbay Docks. This was replaced in 1897 by a new boathouse at the Camber (at the seaward end of the wharf) with its own  launching slip which allowed the lifeboat to get to sea more quickly. A new station was built on the Princess Royal Pier in 1979 and a new mooring was provided alongside. From 1988 until 1992 the lifeboat was moored in Sutton Harbour while the area around the Princess Royal Pier was redeveloped as a marina, but it then returned to Millbay.

An Inshore Rescue Boat (IRB) was first stationed at Plymouth in May 1967. After a year when this was a D class inflatable, larger ILBs were provided.

Service awards
A number of rescues carried out by the station's lifeboats have been recognised by letters, certificates and medals from the RNLI management, including three that resulted in a total of four bronze medals.

Coxswain Walter Crowther was awarded a medal after the Robert and Marcella Beck was called out on 13 January 1942 (during the Second World War) to a Sunderland flying boat of the Royal Australian Air Force which had been blown onto rocks in a storm. The lifeboat crew managed to get a rope across to the flying boat and towed her and her crew to safety.
Another medal was awarded to Coxswain John Dare "for his courage, determination and excellent seamanship" on 16 January 1974. The lifeboat Thomas Forehead and Mary Rowse fought through hurricane-force winds to reach the casualty. A helicopter managed to winch seven people out of the water while the lifeboat searched for other survivors but failed to find any.
The third bronze medal rescue involved the Thomas Forehead and Mary Rowse II on 15 February 1978. The Elly Gerda ran aground near Looe in a Force 8 storm. The lifeboat managed to rescue two of the trawler's crew but the heavy seas then washed the trawler off the rocks. The lifeboat escorted it back into harbour and then returned to Plymouth, where it had left its berth nearly 14 hours earlier. The RNLI awarded medals to both the Coxswain, Patrick Marshall, and the Mechanic, Cyril Alcock, "for their courage, determination and seamanship".

Facilities
Since 1992 the all weather lifeboat has been moored afloat in the Millbay Marina, which is on the eastern side of the outer basin. The inshore lifeboat is kept next to it in a floating cradle.

Crew facilities and storage are in the old Customs Office on the quay close to the moorings. This is a Grade II Listed building which was erected in 1850 to the design of George Wightwick. It is built from granite, octagonal in plan and three storeys high. This gave the customs officers all-round views of the area.

Area of operation

Current lifeboats

  17–35 (ON 1264) Sybil Mullen Glover – on station since 2003
  B775 Millennium Forester – on station 2004–05 and again since 2006

Former lifeboats
'ON' is the RNLI's sequential Official Number; 'Op. No.' is the operational number painted onto the boat.

Pulling and sailing lifeboats

Motor lifeboats

Inshore lifeboats

Notes

See also
 List of RNLI stations

References

External links

 Official station website
 RNLI station information

Lifeboat stations in Devon
Buildings and structures in Plymouth, Devon
Grade II listed buildings in Devon